Sean Tallaire (born October 3, 1973) is a Canadian former professional ice hockey player who played in the International Hockey League and the Deutsche Eishockey Liga (DEL).

Career
Tallaire played college hockey at Lake Superior State University from 1992 to 1996.  Tallaire was selected in the eight round, 202nd overall, by the Vancouver Canucks in the 1993 NHL Entry Draft.  He was named the tournament MVP at the 1994 NCAA Championship Tournament, which was won by LSSU.

After college, Tallaire played in the International Hockey League from 1996 to 2001 with the Manitoba Moose, Grand Rapids Griffins, Cleveland Lumberjacks, Long Beach Ice Dogs, Utah Grizzlies, and Kansas City Blades.  His best season came with the Grizzlies in 1999-2000, when he scored 31 goals and had 65 points.  Aside from the IHL, Tallaire also had brief stints in the American Hockey League and Western Professional Hockey League.

In 2001, Tallaire went to Europe to play in Germany, joining the Iserlohn Roosters of the DEL.  After one season with the Roosters, he played three years with the ERC Ingolstadt, interrupted by a season with the Nürnberg Ice Tigers.  He signed a one-year contract with the Kölner Haie prior to the 2006-2007 season, in which he was having his best season offensively before tearing his ACL midway through the season. After his recovery, Kölner offered him another one-year contract for the following season, in which the Sharks were league runners up. Talliare signed with Kölner's rival, Kassel Huskies and played two seasons with them.

Personal

Career statistics

Awards and honours

References

External links

1973 births
Living people
Central Texas Stampede players
Cleveland Lumberjacks players
Grand Rapids Griffins players
ERC Ingolstadt players
Kansas City Blades players
Kassel Huskies players
Kölner Haie players
Ice hockey people from Manitoba
Iserlohn Roosters players
Lake Superior State Lakers men's ice hockey players
Long Beach Ice Dogs (IHL) players
Manitoba Moose (IHL) players
Nürnberg Ice Tigers players
Springfield Falcons players
Sportspeople from Steinbach, Manitoba
Utah Grizzlies (IHL) players
Vancouver Canucks draft picks
Canadian ice hockey right wingers
NCAA men's ice hockey national champions
AHCA Division I men's ice hockey All-Americans